A total solar eclipse occurred on October 21, 1930. A solar eclipse occurs when the Moon passes between Earth and the Sun, thereby totally or partly obscuring the image of the Sun for a viewer on Earth. A total solar eclipse occurs when the Moon's apparent diameter is larger than the Sun's, blocking all direct sunlight, turning day into darkness. Totality occurs in a narrow path across Earth's surface, with the partial solar eclipse visible over a surrounding region thousands of kilometres wide. Totality was visible from Niuafoʻou in Tonga, Chile, and a tiny part of Santa Cruz Province, Argentina.

Related eclipses

Solar eclipses 1928–1931

Saros series 142

Inex series

Notes

References

1930 10 21
1930 in science
1930 10 21
October 1930 events